"The Ten O'Clock People" is a short story by American author Stephen King, published in the Nightmares & Dreamscapes collection. Unlike many of King's stories which take place in fictional places like Castle Rock, Maine, "Ten O'Clock People" takes place in Boston, Massachusetts.  A film adaptation has been announced.

Plot
Pearson, a Boston office worker, discovers that people of authority, including many police officers and political figures, including the Vice President of the United States, are inhuman monsters disguised as people. While on his 10 o'clock smoke break, Pearson perceives the bat-like creatures through their disguises. Noticing his reaction, a young black man named Dudley "Duke" Rhinemann stops him from screaming and calms him down. Rhinemann explains that if Pearson wants to live, he must go about his day as usual and meet him at 3 o'clock after work. Pearson does as he is told and discovers that his boss is also one of the "batmen". He leaves work a bit shaken, meets Rhinemann and goes to a bar with him. Rhinemann explains that a unique chemical imbalance caused by nicotine withdrawal is the only way to see the creatures and invites Pearson to a resistance meeting.

Shortly after arriving, the leader of the group says he has "big news" for them all. Pearson realizes the man is stalling for time and gives warning. The treacherous leader says the batmen have granted them amnesty, but a horde of them attack those in the meeting. Many die, including Rhinemann. Pearson, along with two others, escape the meeting. The trio flee to Omaha and form a new resistance group of Ten O'Clock People. This group successfully kills many "batmen", and Pearson notes that their war against the batmen was a lot like quitting smoking: "...you have to start somewhere."

Connections to other works 
Several of King's other stories, most notably Low Men in Yellow Coats and The Dark Tower, feature malevolent creatures called Can-toi, which bear a  resemblance to the "batmen" of The Ten O'Clock People. Servants of the Crimson King, the Can-toi are vaguely humanoid beings with large rodent heads, which they hide beneath masks in order to infiltrate human society. King references Raymond Chandler in the story, as to disguise the real reason of the meeting, they claim to be Raymond Chandler enthusiasts.

In the book's ending notes, King relates that this story had one of the shortest gestation periods of any of his pieces—he conceived and wrote it feverishly over a mere three days. 

It has been noted that the plot of King's story also resembles the premise of John Carpenter's movie They Live, made in 1988, which itself was based on the story "Eight O'Clock in the Morning" 
by Ray Nelson.

Reception 
George Beahm wrote in his encyclopedia of King stories that plot summaries can not do the story justice and that it must be read to appreciate the bizarreness.  He further compared it to Invasion of the Body Snatchers.  In The Essential Steven King, author Stephen J. Spignesi called it is a complete horror film told in 50 pages that begs for a film adaptation.

Adaptations 
In May 2011, Making Ten O'clock Productions acquired the rights to adapt "The Ten O'Clock People" into a feature film starring Jay Baruchel. The film's plot is a modernization of King's original story and will be directed by Tom Holland. It was announced in July 2015 that the new title of the film is Cessation.

In February 2021, it was reported that a television adaptation of "The Ten O'Clock People" was being developed by Fabel Entertainment.

See also
 Stephen King short fiction bibliography

References

1993 short stories
Short stories by Stephen King
Horror short stories